Cambiemos Movimiento Ciudadano (English: Let's Change - Citizen's Movement) is a Venezuelan political party with a center of pluralist and progressive tendency founded on 11 May 2018. This movement belongs to the opposition coalition Agreement for Change.

Political philosophy 
On their website they describe themselves as a "progressive court" organization.  On the other hand, they have chosen to defend a policy based on dialogue, peace, coexistence and reconciliation; which they consider necessary for a “full democracy” and an “economy of opportunities and solidarity”.

In addition, they are opposed to abstentionism and in favor of citizen political participation.  It also defends the rights of women and the LGBT community.  At the socioeconomic level, Cambiemos defends the participation of private companies in conjunction with public policies that have a deep social meaning», while trusting in entrepreneurship "that unleashes the creative spirit of the common citizen that makes it an actor subject of change."

History 
According to its website, Cambiemos was founded in May 2018 as a result "of a long debate of its promoters on the need to build alternatives to the serious situation that Venezuela has experienced in recent years, marked by polarization and confrontation."

In April 2018, still without being a party, they reject the abstention line of other sectors of the opposition before the 2018 presidential elections, allying themselves with other movements and parties with which they would later found the Concertación por el Cambio coalition.

In May 2018, they are consolidated as a parliamentary fraction made up of the deputies Melva Paredes (Aragua), Maribel Guedez (Barinas), Adolfo Superlano (Barinas), Timoteo Zambrano (Zulia) and Mary Álvarez (Zulia). A month later, they are legalized as a party by the National Electoral Council (CNE).

National Assembly deputies

Main 
Melva Paredes - Aragua
Adolfo Superlano (expelled) - Barinas
Maribel Guédez - Barinas
José Antonio Spain (expelled) - Delta Amacuro
José Gregorio Aparicio (expelled) - Sucre
Timoteo Zambrano (does not attend the AN) - Zulia

Substitutes 
Mary Alvarez - Zulia

Electoral history 
After being legalized as a political movement before the CNE, the party participated for the first time in Venezuelan elections in the 2018 municipal elections, a contest where the 2459 councilors in the country would be elected, of which Cambie would obtain 2 seats in the Arismendi municipality in Barinas. The results by state and the percentage of participation are shown below:

References 

2018 establishments in Venezuela
Crisis in Venezuela
Organizations established in 2018
Political opposition organizations
Political parties in Venezuela
Politics of Venezuela
Political organizations based in Venezuela